Canım Hoca Mehmed Pasha (also known as Canum Hoca in European sources) was an 18th-century Ottoman admiral of Greek origin who served three times as Kapudan Pasha (grand admiral of the Ottoman Navy).

Originally a Greek Muslim from the fortress town of Koroni in the southwestern Peloponnese (in southern Greece), Canım Hoca Mehmed was captured by the Venetians during the Morean War (1684–1699) and served seven years as a galley slave in the Venetian fleet, until ransomed for 100 gold ducats.

He entered his first term as Kapudan Pasha in December 1714, upon the outbreak of the war with Venice. He distinguished himself in this war through the capture of Tinos, as well as for his humane treatment of the Venetian captives in the Morea, in stark contrast to the brutal behaviour of the Grand Vizier, Silahdar Damat Ali Pasha. In a battle fought on 8 July 1716, he led the Ottoman fleet in the failed attempt to capture Corfu, the chief of the Ionian Islands, then under Venetian rule.

Dismissed from his post in February 1717, he regained it for a few days in 1730, and became once more Kapudan Pasha in 1732, holding the post until 1736.

References

Sources 
 

17th-century births
18th-century deaths
18th-century Ottoman military personnel
Kapudan Pashas
Slaves from the Ottoman Empire
Ottoman prisoners of war
Ottoman people of the Ottoman–Venetian Wars
Prisoners and detainees of the Republic of Venice

People from Koroni